This is a list of awards of the Argentine TV series Graduados

Tato Awards

Martín Fierro awards

Graduados
Argentina culture-related lists